Chorrera idiotes is a species of snout moth. It was described by Harrison Gray Dyar Jr. in 1914. It is found in Panama.

The forewings are dark grey with a slightly luteous underground, irrorated with black. The hindwings are pure white and translucent.

References

Phycitinae
Moths of Central America
Moths described in 1914
Moths of South America